Glenn Edward Brummer (born November 23, 1954, in Olney, Illinois) is an American former Major League Baseball catcher who played for the St. Louis Cardinals and the Texas Rangers.

Brummer was born in Olney, Illinois. His father, Bob Brummer, briefly played minor league baseball. Glenn Brummer attended Effingham High School in Effingham, Illinois. After graduation, he was working on his family's farm when he heard that the Lake Land College baseball team needed a catcher. "It was either enroll in school or milk cows all my life," Brummer said. Signed by the Cardinals as an amateur free agent in 1974, he made his Major League Baseball debut with St. Louis on May 25, 1981.

On August 22, 1982, Brummer stole home plate with two outs in the bottom of the 12th inning to give the Cardinals a 5–4 win over the San Francisco Giants. A steal of home is a rare play, and the attempt was made especially unusual because there were two strikes on the Cardinals batter. With two strikes, a batter must be prepared to swing at a good pitch, and this normally prevents a runner from stealing home. Cardinals manager Whitey Herzog said that he did not plan Brummer's stolen base attempt. "Nobody knew he was coming. I didn't, either," Herzog said. This was one of four career stolen bases for Brummer.

Brummer was on the Cardinals postseason roster when they defeated the Milwaukee Brewers in the 1982 World Series. He did not play in the National League Championship Series and did not have any World Series plate appearances, but he played catcher in the ninth inning of World Series Game 6, which the Cardinals won 13–1.

On March 24, 1985, Brummer was released by the Cardinals. The next month, he signed with the Texas Rangers. Brummer appeared in his final major league game on October 6, 1985. He was released by the Rangers on November 13 of that year. Brummer's last season to play professional baseball was 1986, when he played 79 games for the Hawaii Islanders, the Triple-A affiliate of the Pittsburgh Pirates.

References

External links
, or Pelota Binaria (Venezuelan Winter League)

1954 births
Living people
Arkansas Travelers players
Baseball players from Illinois
Cardenales de Lara players
American expatriate baseball players in Venezuela
Gulf Coast Cardinals players
Hawaii Islanders players
Johnson City Cardinals players
Louisville Redbirds players
Lynchburg Mets players
Major League Baseball catchers
Oklahoma City 89ers players
People from Olney, Illinois
Springfield Redbirds players
St. Louis Cardinals players
St. Petersburg Cardinals players
Texas Rangers players
Lake Land Lakers baseball players